The Women's 200 metre backstroke competition at the 2017 World Championships was held on 28 and 29 July 2017.

Records
Prior to the competition, the existing world and championship records were as follows.

Results

Heats
The heats were held on 28 July at 10:31.

Semifinals
The semifinals were held on 28 July at 17:49.

Semifinal 1

Semifinal 2

Final
The final was held on 29 July at 17:47.

References

Women's 200 metre backstroke
2017 in women's swimming